Church Street is a tram stop for westbound Tramlink trams in central Croydon, England. It serves all routes, with routes either turning right to continue around the 'Croydon Loop', or carrying on westward towards Wimbledon and Therapia Lane.

References

External links

Church Street tram stop on TheTrams.co.uk
Another photo of this stop

Tramlink stops in the London Borough of Croydon